The Bismarck Tribune Building on N. 4th St. in Bismarck, North Dakota was designed by architect George H. Shanley and was built in 1920.  

It was listed on the National Register of Historic Places (NRHP) in 1982.

According to its NRHP nomination it is a "rare application" of Prairie School architecture in North Dakota.

The editor, George Douglas Mann, recruited a Great Falls, Montana, designer to plan this flame resistant structure with substantial casing and floors, primary mud tile dividers, and Hebron pressed block outside. The famous Prairie Style configuration accentuates flat extents and joins enhancing brickwork with applied earthenware decoration with themes of adapted lights, blossoms, leaves, and lotus buds. Block header courses emphasize the pilasters that help rectangular spandrels between the first-and second-floor windows. A particular polychrome earthenware bas-help board over the fundamental passage recreates a work of art of priests rehearsing the printer's art on a hand press. The Bismarck Tribune Building has filled in as office space since the newspaper relocated its operations in 1981.

Location 

The building is located in a great central area and is within walking distance from many places.
Nearby the estate you can find various places:
 The Downtown Historic District
 The US post office and the Municipal courthouse
 The Burleigh county courthouse
 The Patterson place ( The Patterson hotel & The Mackenzie hotel )
 The Northern Pacific (NP) Railway Depot

See also 
Link to photograph at State Historical Society of North Dakota

References

Newspaper headquarters in the United States
Newspaper buildings
Commercial buildings on the National Register of Historic Places in North Dakota
Prairie School architecture in North Dakota
Commercial buildings completed in 1920
National Register of Historic Places in Bismarck, North Dakota
1920 establishments in North Dakota